At the Speed of Twisted Thought... is a compilation album by Lansing, MI-based hardcore punk band the Fix, released by Touch and Go Records in 2006, 24 years after the Fix disbanded.

Track listing

 "Vengeance" - 1:26
 "In this Town" - 1:20
 "Cos the Elite" - 1:19
 "Truth Right Now" - 1:30
 "Signals" - 3:37
 "Off to War" - 1:33
 "No Idols" - 1:36
 "Candy Store" - 1:14
 "Famous" - 1:45
 "Vengeance" [Outtake] - 1:21
 "Celebre" [Outtake] - 1:40
 "Rat Patrol" [Outtake] - 1:42
 "Cos the Elite" [live] - 1:31
 "The Letter" [live] - 0:48
 "Famous" [live] - 1:40
 "Off to War" [live] - 1:39
 "In this Town" [live] - 1:28
 "Rat Patrol" [live] - 1:41
 "Statement" [live] - 1:17
 "Candy Store" [live] - 1:12
 "You" [live] - 0:48
 "Teenage Drugs" [live] - 0:55
 "Wating for Eviction" [live] - 2:14
 "Media Blitz" [live] - 1:36

References

2006 compilation albums
The Fix (band) albums